Ameletus cryptostimulus is a species of combmouthed minnow mayfly in the family Ameletidae. It is found in southeastern Canada and the eastern United States.

References

Further reading

 
 
 
 
 
 

mayflies
Insects described in 1978